An Encyclopedia of Claims, Frauds, and Hoaxes of the Occult and Supernatural is a 1995 book by James Randi with a foreword by Arthur C. Clarke. It serves as a reference for various pseudoscience and paranormal subjects.

In 2006, Randi made the work available free online.

See also
James Randi Educational Foundation
Skeptic's Dictionary

References

External links
An Encyclopedia of Claims, Frauds, and Hoaxes of the Occult and Supernatural - Online Version
An Encyclopedia of Claims, Frauds, and Hoaxes of the Occult and Supernatural  – Online Version
 An Encyclopedia of Claims, Frauds, and Hoaxes of the Occult and Supernatural – Index

1995 non-fiction books
Books by James Randi
Occult books
Scientific skepticism mass media
St. Martin's Press books
Supernatural healing